Vlad Dumitru Mihalcea  (born 28 October 1998) is a Romanian professional footballer who plays as an attacking midfielder for Concordia Chiajna. In his career, Mihalcea also played for teams such as FCSB, Academica Clinceni or Universitatea Cluj, among others.

Club career

FCSB

After playing for FC Brașov's youth teams for a few years, Mihalcea signed his first professional contract in June 2015, when he put pen-to-paper on a 6-year contract with Romanian champions FCSB. He had a great start for a youngster in pre-season, getting 2 assists and scoring once in 5 friendly matches.

Honours

Club
FCSB
League Cup: 2015–16

References

External links
 Player's page at UEFA

Footballers from Bucharest
Living people
1998 births
Romanian footballers
Romania youth international footballers
Association football midfielders
Liga I players
Liga II players
FC Steaua București players
FC Steaua II București players
LPS HD Clinceni players
FC Voluntari players
FC Universitatea Cluj players
CS Aerostar Bacău players
FC Brașov (2021) players
CS Concordia Chiajna players